Andrey Alekseevich Tyumentsev (born May 6, 1963 in Vladivostok) is a former Soviet/Russian handball player who competed in the 1988 Summer Olympics.

In 1988, he won the gold medal with the Soviet team. He played all six matches and scored 21 goals.

External links
profile

1963 births
Living people
Soviet male handball players
Russian male handball players
Handball players at the 1988 Summer Olympics
Olympic handball players of the Soviet Union
Olympic gold medalists for the Soviet Union
Olympic medalists in handball
Sportspeople from Vladivostok
Medalists at the 1988 Summer Olympics
BM Granollers players